Julien Benneteau and Édouard Roger-Vasselin were the defending champions but chose not to defend their title.

Quentin Halys and Tristan Lamasine won the title after defeating Adrián Menéndez-Maceiras and Stefano Napolitano 7–6(11–9), 6–1 in the final.

Seeds

Draw

References
 Main Draw

BNP Paribas de Nouvelle-Caledonie - Doubles